Koriass is the stage name of Emmanuel Dubois (born March 12, 1984), a Canadian rapper from Quebec. He is a two-time winner of the Prix Félix for Best Hip Hop Album, in 2014 for Rue des Saules and in 2016 for Love Suprême, was a shortlisted finalist for the Juno Award for Francophone Album of the Year at the Juno Awards of 2017 for Love Suprême, and won the Echo Songwriting Prize in the French division in 2012 for his song "St-Eustache".

He received another Juno Award nomination for Francophone Album of the Year at the Juno Awards of 2020, for his 2019 album La nuit des longs couteaux.

Discography

Albums
Les racines dans le béton (2008)
Petites victoires (2011)
Rue des Saules (2013)
Love Suprême (2016)
La nuit des longs couteaux (2018)
Génies en herbes (with FouKi, 2020)
Abri de fortune (pour fin du monde) (2022)

EPs
Mort de rire (2006, EP)
Petit love (2015, EP)

References

1984 births
Canadian male rappers
21st-century Canadian rappers
French Quebecers
Musicians from Montreal
Living people
21st-century Canadian male musicians